WHOOP is an American wearable technology company headquartered in Boston, Massachusetts. Its principal product is a fitness tracker that measures strain, recovery, and sleep. The device is best known for its use by athletes.

The WHOOP band is popular among both consumers and professional athletes such as basketball player LeBron James, golfer Rory McIlroy and swimmer Michael Phelps.

Product 
WHOOP 1.0 was released in 2015. A second version arrived in 2016, and a third in 2019. WHOOP 4.0 debuted in 2021, with battery technology developed by Sila Nanotechnologies that replaces graphite anodes with silicon, thus increasing battery capacity.

The wearable device collects data on sleep, heart rate variability, resting heart rate, and respiratory rate to create a daily recovery score for users. The recovery score ranges from 0% to 100% to let users know if their body is recovered or if it needs rest.

The most notable difference between WHOOP and other wearables is physical: WHOOP has no screen or buttons; all information must be viewed on a user's smartphone. The WHOOP app is available on Android and Apple devices.

Other notable differences include price (WHOOP charges a monthly subscription fee; the device stops tracking without a subscription) and data (according to Time, the device accumulates more data than its peers; its five sensors collect 100 megabytes of data per user, per day).

History 
In 2012, Will Ahmed, a Harvard University student athlete, founded WHOOP to help athletes gain greater visibility into their own fitness and rest. Along with two fellow students at Harvard, John Capodilupo and Aurelian Nicolae, Ahmed incubated a prototype at Harvard Innovation Labs. The company raised $200 million from venture capital fund SoftBank in August 2021, at a valuation of $3.6 billion.

As of November 2022, Ahmed is the company's chief executive officer,  and Nicolae is the director of mechanical engineering. Capodilupo was chief technology officer until he stepped down in April 2022. He was replaced as CTO by Jaime Waydo in November 2022. Antonio Bertone former Chief Marketing Officer of PUMA USA was hired in 2018 to serve as chief marketing officer of WHOOP.

Investors in the startup include institutions such as the SoftBank Group and the National Football League Players Association, as well as individuals such as basketball player Kevin Durant and football players Patrick Mahomes and Eli Manning.

The name "WHOOP" is a phrase Ahmed used before big games in college.

Sports 

WHOOP has been approved as a fitness wearable by various professional sports leagues and their labor unions. These include CrossFit, the Ladies Professional Golf Association, Major League Baseball, the National Football League Players Association, and the PGA Tour.

The wearable is popular among celebrity athletes, including swimmer Michael Phelps, basketball player LeBron James,  and golfers Rory McIlroy, Nelly Korda, and Tiger Woods.

In 2017, NBA players DeAndre Jordan, Matthew Dellavedova, and others were reported to be hiding WHOOP devices under their wristbands during games, despite the NBA prohibiting wearables for in-game use.

References 

Companies based in Boston